Pristimantis tribulosus is a species of frog in the family Strabomantidae. It is endemic to Colombia and is only known from the vicinity of its type locality near Samaná in the Caldas Department, on the eastern slope of the Cordillera Central (Colombian Andes). The specific name tribulosus, meaning "thorny", refers to the numerous tubercles that cover the upper surfaces of this species.

Description
Adult females—based on only two specimens, including the holotype—measure  in snout–vent length (SVL). The only male known at the time of the species description was a juvenile measuring  SVL. The head is slightly narrower than the body and longer than it is wide. The snout is long, acuminate in dorsal view and protruding in lateral view. The tympanum is vertically elongated. The supratympanic fold is obsolete. The fingers are long and slender and have thin lateral keels and round terminal discs. The toes are also long and slender but lack lateral keels; the toe discs are smaller than those on the fingers. Dorsal skin is finely shagreen with heavy paravertebral folds and bears numerous conical tubercles. Dorsal coloration is moss green with a diffuse brown pattern. The flanks are uniformly green. The limbs have reddish-brown bands. The throat and the anterior part of the abdomen are pale cream, turning very pale yellow posteriorly.

Habitat and conservation
It is a nocturnal frog usually found on low vegetation in dense, intact forest (although the holotype was collected from secondary forest). Development is direct (i.e., there is no free-living larval stage). 

Pristimantis tribulosus  is a rare species only known from single forest fragment, though this is partly because of the limited survey effort. It is threatened by habitat loss caused by subsistence wood collecting, pine plantations, and agricultural development.

References

tribulosus
Amphibians of the Andes
Amphibians of Colombia
Endemic fauna of Colombia
Amphibians described in 1997
Taxa named by John Douglas Lynch
Taxa named by José Vicente Rueda Almonacid
Taxonomy articles created by Polbot